John Rosser may refer to:
 John Rosser (cricketer), Australian cricketer
 John Rosser (rower), Australian rower
 J. Barkley Rosser, American logician
 J. Barkley Rosser Jr., his son, mathematical economist and professor of economics